Anoxia is a genus of dung beetle in the family Scarabaeidae.

Species
Species within this genus include:

 Anoxia affinis
 Anoxia africana
 Anoxia arenbergeri
 Anoxia asiatica
 Anoxia australis
 Anoxia baraudi
 Anoxia caphtor
 Anoxia ciliciensis
 Anoxia cingulata
 Anoxia cretica
 Anoxia cypria
 Anoxia derelicta
 Anoxia desbrochersi
 Anoxia emarginata
 Anoxia hirta
 Anoxia hungarica
 Anoxia kocheri
 Anoxia kraatzi
 Anoxia laevimacula
 Anoxia lodosi
 Anoxia luteipilosa
 Anoxia maculiventris
 Anoxia makrisi
 Anoxia maldesi
 Anoxia matutinalis
 Anoxia mavromoustaksi
 Anoxia monacha
 Anoxia naviauxi
 Anoxia niceaensis
 Anoxia nigricolor
 Anoxia orientalis
 Anoxia pasiphae
 Anoxia pilosa
 Anoxia rattoi
 Anoxia reisseri
 Anoxia rotroui
 Anoxia scutellaris
 Anoxia smyrnensis
 Anoxia tristis
 Anoxia villosa

References 

Melolonthinae